Heidenheim may refer to:

 Heidenheim an der Brenz, town in Baden-Württemberg, southern Germany
1. FC Heidenheim 1846, German football club from the city of Heidenheim
Heidenheim (district), district (Kreis) in the east of Baden-Württemberg
 Heidenheim, Bavaria, municipality in the Hahnenkamm, Weißenburg-Gunzenhausen district, Bavaria, Germany

People with the surname 
 Philipp Heidenheim (1814–1906), German rabbi and educator
 Wolf Heidenheim (1757–1832), German exegete and grammarian